Journal for the History of Astronomy (JHA) is a peer-reviewed academic journal that publishes papers in the History of Astronomy from earliest times to the present, and in history in the service of astronomy. The journal's founding editor was Michael Hoskin of Cambridge University and it is currently edited by James Evans of the University of Puget Sound. It has been in publication since 1970 and is currently published by SAGE Publications.

From 1979 to 2002, Archaeoastronomy was published as a supplement to JHA, but was incorporated into JHA in 2003.

Abstracting and indexing 
Journal for the History of Astronomy is abstracted and indexed in, among other databases:  SCOPUS, and the Social Sciences Citation Index. According to the Journal Citation Reports, its 2012 impact factor is 0.326, ranking it 39 out of 58 journals in the category ‘History & Philosophy of Science’.

References

External links 
 

SAGE Publishing academic journals
English-language journals
History of astronomy journals
Publications established in 1970
Quarterly journals